William Stuart Clarke (January 24, 1906 – August 26, 1985) was a Major League Baseball shortstop who played for the Pittsburgh Pirates in  and .

External links

1906 births
1985 deaths
Major League Baseball shortstops
Pittsburgh Pirates players
Baseball players from California